In computer software, an application binary interface (ABI) is an interface between two binary program modules. Often, one of these modules is a library or operating system facility, and the other is a program that is being run by a user.

An ABI defines how data structures or computational routines are accessed in machine code, which is a low-level, hardware-dependent format. In contrast, an API defines this access in source code, which is a relatively high-level, hardware-independent, often human-readable format. A common aspect of an ABI is the calling convention, which determines how data is provided as input to, or read as output from, computational routines. Examples of this are the x86 calling conventions.

Adhering to an ABI (which may or may not be officially standardized) is usually the job of a compiler, operating system, or library author. However, an application programmer may have to deal with an ABI directly when writing a program in a mix of programming languages, or even compiling a program written in the same language with different compilers.

Description 
Details covered by an ABI include the following:
 Processor instruction set, with details like register file structure, stack organization, memory access types, etc.
 Sizes, layouts, and alignments of basic data types that the processor can directly access
 Calling convention, which controls how the arguments of functions are passed, and return values retrieved; for example, it controls the following:
 Whether all parameters are passed on the stack, or some are passed in registers
 Which registers are used for which function parameters
 Whether the first function parameter passed on the stack is pushed first or last
 How an application should make system calls to the operating system, and if the ABI specifies direct system calls rather than procedure calls to system call stubs, the system call numbers
 In the case of a complete operating system ABI, the binary format of object files, program libraries, etc.

Complete ABIs 
A complete ABI, such as the Intel Binary Compatibility Standard (iBCS), allows a program from one operating system supporting that ABI to run without modifications on any other such system, provided that necessary shared libraries are present, and similar prerequisites are fulfilled.

ABIs can also standardize details such as the C++ name mangling, exception propagation, and calling convention between compilers on the same platform, but do not require cross-platform compatibility.

Embedded ABIs 
An embedded-application binary interface (EABI) specifies standard conventions for file formats, data types, register usage, stack frame organization, and function parameter passing of an embedded software program, for use with an embedded operating system.

Compilers that support the EABI create object code that is compatible with code generated by other such compilers, allowing developers to link libraries generated with one compiler with object code generated with another compiler. Developers writing their own assembly language code may also interface with assembly generated by a compliant compiler.

EABIs are designed to optimize for performance within the limited resources of an embedded system. Therefore, EABIs omit most abstractions that are made between kernel and user code in complex operating systems. For example, dynamic linking may be avoided to allow smaller executables and faster loading, fixed register usage allows more compact stacks and kernel calls, and running the application in privileged mode allows direct access to custom hardware operation without the indirection of calling a device driver.  The choice of EABI can affect performance.

Widely used EABIs include PowerPC, Arm EABI and MIPS EABI. Specific software implementations like the C library may impose additional limitations to form more concrete ABIs; one example is the GNU OABI and EABI for ARM, both of which are subsets of the ARM EABI .

See also 

 Binary-code compatibility
 Bytecode
 Comparison of application virtualization software
 Debug symbol
 Foreign function interface
 Language binding
 Native (computing)
 Opaque pointer
 PowerOpen Environment
 Symbol table
 SWIG
 Visual C++ ABI instability details

References

External links 
 Policies/Binary Compatibility Issues With C++ a compendium of development rules of thumb for not breaking binary compatibility between library releases
 OS X ABI Function Call Guide
 Debian ARM EABI port
 μClib: Motorola 8/16-bit embedded ABI
 
 Application Binary Interface (ABI) for the ARM Architecture
 MIPS EABI documentation
  a summary and comparison of some popular ABIs
 M•CORE Applications Binary Interface Standards Manual for the Freescale M·CORE processors

Application programming interfaces
Operating system technology